"Any Little Girl, That's a Nice Little Girl, Is the Right Little Girl for Me" is a popular song, first published in 1910, and written by Thomas J. Gray and Fred Fisher.  Although largely forgotten today (like many popular songs of the era), a 1911 recording of the song by Billy Murray on Zon-O-Phone Records survives, and is widely accessible because the recording has entered the public domain.  It was also featured in a Max Fleischer "Follow the Bouncing Ball" sing-a-long animated cartoon in the early 1930s. The song appears on the soundtrack of the 1933 film Stage Mother. Subsequently, in 1938 it was recorded for Bluebird Records by Shep Fields and his orchestra, with the accordionist John Serry Sr.

See also
1910 in music
1911 in music
Ada Jones

References

External links
 Website with public domain version by Billy Murray

1910 songs
Billy Murray (singer) songs
Songs written by Fred Fisher
Bluebird Records singles